Greece competed at the 2002 Winter Olympics in Salt Lake City, United States. Cindy Ninos finished 13th in the women's skeleton event, which is the best result for Greece at the history of the Winter Olympic Games.

Alpine skiing

Men

Women

Biathlon

Men

Women

 1 A penalty loop of 150 metres had to be skied per missed target. 
 3 One minute added per missed target.

Bobsleigh

Men

Cross-country skiing

Men
Sprint

Pursuit

 1 Starting delay based on 10 km C. results. 
 C = Classical style, F = Freestyle

Women
Sprint

Pursuit

 2 Starting delay based on 5 km C. results. 
 C = Classical style, F = Freestyle

Skeleton

Men

Women

References
Official Olympic Reports
 Olympic Winter Games 2002, full results by sports-reference.com

Nations at the 2002 Winter Olympics
2002
Olympics